Huygens (also Huijgens, Huigens, Huijgen/Huygen, or Huigen) is a Dutch patronymic surname, meaning "son of Hugo". Most references to "Huygens" are to the polymath Christiaan Huygens. Notable people with the surname include:

 Jan Huygen (1563–1611), Dutch voyager and historian
 Constantijn Huygens (1596–1687), Dutch poet, diplomat, scholar and composer
 Constantijn Huygens, Jr. (1628–1697), Dutch statesman, soldier, and telescope maker, son of Constantijn Huygens
 Christiaan Huygens (1629–1695), Dutch mathematician, physicist and astronomer, son of Constantijn Huygens
 Lodewijck Huygens (1631–1699), Dutch diplomat, the third son of Constantijn Huygens
 Cornélie Huygens (1848–1902), Dutch writer, social democrat and feminist
 Léon Huygens (1876–1918), Belgian painter
 Jan Huijgen (1888–1964), Dutch speedwalker
 Christiaan Huijgens (1897–1963), Dutch long-distance runner
 Wil Huygen (1922–2009), Dutch children's and fantasy writer, e.g. of Gnomes

Named after Constantijn Sr
Constantijn Huygens Prize, Dutch literary award
Huygens Institute for Dutch History

Named after Christiaan Huygens

Astronomy:
 Cassini–Huygens, mission to Saturn and Titan
 Huygens (spacecraft), the probe of above mission which landed on Saturn's moon Titan in 2005
 2801 Huygens, an asteroid 
 Huygens (crater), a Martian crater
 Mons Huygens, a mountain of Earth's Moon
 Huygens Gap, main gap in the rings of Saturn
Physics:
 Huygens' principle regarding wave propagation
 Huygens law regarding pendulums
 Huygens–Steiner theorem regarding moment of inertia
Mathematics and games:
 Huygens' tritone, a musical interval
 Huygens lemniscate, a figure eight curve
Microscopes:
 Huygens eyepiece, first compound eye piece
 Huygens Software, a microscope image processing package

Dutch-language surnames
Patronymic surnames